was a Japanese astronomer, discoverer of minor planets and comets.

The fireball passed over west Japan and was recorded by photos and a sketch. Kōichirō Tomita identified that it was the Kosmos 133 spacecraft (30 November 1966).

He is credited by the Minor Planet Center with the discovery of 9 numbered minor planets during 1978–1982, such as 2252 CERGA, 3056 INAG, 3765 Texereau, 4051 Hatanaka.

He is the author of at least one astronomy book (in Japanese) about comets (which was translated and published in Russian in 1982).

The Nysa asteroid 2391 Tomita is named after him.

References 
 

1925 births
2006 deaths
Discoverers of asteroids
Discoverers of comets

20th-century Japanese astronomers